María Ereña Larrea (born 1996) is a Spanish singer and musician.

Life and career 

In 2006 she participated in the hit TV talent show Egin kantu! on the ETB 1 channel as a contestant and singer and in Betizu program, where she debuted at just 10 years of age. Her participation and roles in the hit TV shows Egin kantu! and Betizu brought her acclaimed success and made her a child star in the Basque Country, becaming well known among the children and the audience.

After that, in 2011, she participated in the ETB 1 Haur Kantari Txapelketa program contest, where she was second finalist. In addition to that, she also participated as a contestant in the Stars. Izarrak Kalean and Kantugiro TV shows, leaving her as the winner in both. In 2017, she participated in the ETB 1 musical talent show Bago!az, where she was fourth finalist.

In 2019 she was part of the Gure Doinuak program as part of the program's music team. In 2012 she created the audiovisual project Gaur da eguna together with other artists, an audiovisual project in favor of gender equality and for the elimination of all violence against women.

She studied the Bachelor's Degree in Law at the University of Deusto (2014-2018). Her final degree thesis was about open government and the importance of transparency (public information, limits, ...).

She is currently a professional singer and musician. She is the vocalist of the Basque music group Patx & Run.

Discography 

 2019, Itzalak

Filmography

Television

References

External links 

 

1996 births
Living people
Spanish singers
Basque singers
Spanish child singers
Spanish child actresses